Scythris seliniella is a species of moth belonging to the family Scythrididae.

It is native to Western Europe.

References

Scythrididae